The UCF Knights college football team competes as part of the NCAA Division I Football Bowl Subdivision (FBS), representing the University of Central Florida in the American Athletic Conference. Since the program's first season in 1979 under Don Jonas, the Knights have played over 465 regular-season games, earning 256 official victories. UCF has won six division championships (2005, 2007, 2010, 2012, 2017, 2018), six conference championships (2007, 2010, 2013, 2014, 2017, 2018), and has made ten postseason appearances since joining FBS, including three BCS/NY6 bowl games. The Knights also claim a National Championship for the 2017 season, as recognized by the Colley Matrix. The Knights' current head coach is Gus Malzahn. The Knights have played their home games at FBC Mortgage Stadium, located on the main campus of UCF in Orlando, Florida, since 2007.

UCF began as a Division III program, moving in succession to Division II, Division I-AA (now Division I FCS), and subsequently completed their ascension to Division I-A, now FBS, in 1996. This made UCF the first, and still only, NCAA football program to have competed at all four levels of play. As a Division I–AA program, the Knights made the 1990 and 1993 playoffs. 

After George O'Leary took over the program, the Knights gained national prominence as members of C-USA and later the AAC. O'Leary guided UCF to their first division title (2005), first conference championship (2007), first bowl game (2005), first bowl victory (2010), first appearance/victory in a New Year's Six game (2014), first national rankings, and numerous other milestones and superlatives.

The Knights' main rivals are the South Florida Bulls; other historic rivals include East Carolina and Marshall. UCF has played one Consensus All-American, Kevin Smith in 2007, and produced three Heisman Trophy candidates, Daunte Culpepper in 1998, Kevin Smith in 2007, and McKenzie Milton in 2017 and 2018. The program has also produced a long-line of NFL players. Playing in fourteen Super Bowls and including four pro-bowlers, the list most notably includes Blake Bortles, Brandon Marshall, Bruce Miller, Daunte Culpepper, Matt Prater, Asante Samuel, and Josh Sitton.

Seasons

References
General:
 Holic, Nathan, and the UCF Alumni Association. University of Central Florida: The Campus History Series (2009), 
 MacCambridge, Michael. ESPN College Football Encyclopedia: The Complete history of the Game (2005), 

In-text:

External links

 Official Athletics Site
 University of Central Florida Official Site

UCF Knights
UCF Knights football seasons